Aravane Rezaï was the defending champion, but lost to Polona Hercog in the second round.

Eighth seed Hercog reached the final, where she defeated home player Johanna Larsson, 6–4, 7–5.

Seeds

Qualifying draw

Draw

Finals

Top half

Bottom half

External Links
Main Draw

Swedish Open - Women's Singles
2011 Women's Singles
2011 in Swedish women's sport